Anastasia Iamachkine (born 12 September 2000) is a Peruvian tennis player. On the ITF Circuit, she was inactive from January 2020 to August 2022.

She has a career-high combined junior ranking of 77, achieved on 6 March 2017.

Iamachkine has represented Peru in Fed Cup competitions, where she has a win–loss record of 10–8.

ITF Circuit finals

Doubles: 7 (3 titles, 4 runner–ups)

ITF Junior finals

Singles (4–1)

Doubles (0–1)

National representation

Fed Cup
Iamachkine made her Fed Cup debut for Peru in 2016, while the team was competing in the Americas Zone Group I, when she was 15 years and 144 days old.

Fed Cup (10–8)

Singles (6–5)

Doubles (4–3)

External links
 
 
 

2000 births
Living people
Peruvian female tennis players
Sportspeople from Lima
Peruvian people of Russian descent
Pan American Games medalists in tennis
Pan American Games bronze medalists for Peru
Tennis players at the 2019 Pan American Games
Medalists at the 2019 Pan American Games
21st-century Peruvian women